The southern myotis (Myotis aelleni) is a species of vesper bat. It is found only in Argentina.

Based on qualitative and quantitative analyses of type specimens, Novaes, Wilson, Ruedi and Moratelli treat this taxon as a junior synonym of Myotis chiloensis.

References

Mouse-eared bats
Mammals of Patagonia
Mammals of Argentina
Mammals described in 1979
Taxonomy articles created by Polbot
Bats of South America